
Mława County is a unit of territorial administration and local government (powiat) in Masovian Voivodeship, east-central Poland. It came into being on January 1, 1999, as a result of the Polish local government reforms passed in 1998.

As of 2019 its total population is 72,906, out of which the population of Mława is 31,241, and the rural population is 41,665.

Neighbouring counties
Mława County is bordered by Nidzica County to the north, Przasnysz County to the east, Ciechanów County and Płońsk County to the south, Żuromin County to the west, and Działdowo County to the north-west.

Administrative division
The county is subdivided into 10 gminas (one urban and nine rural). These are listed in the following table, in descending order of population.

References

 
Land counties of Masovian Voivodeship